Thomas Muster was the defending champion but did not compete that year.

Carlos Moyá won in the final 6–0, 7–6(7–4) against Félix Mantilla.

Seeds
A champion seed is indicated in bold text while text in italics indicates the round in which that seed was eliminated.

  Albert Costa (quarterfinals)
  Alberto Berasategui (first round)
  Félix Mantilla (final)
  Carlos Moyá (champion)
  Carlos Costa (second round)
  Hernán Gumy (first round)
  Ctislav Doseděl (semifinals)
  Karim Alami (second round)

Draw

External links
 1996 Croatia Open draw

Croatia Open
1996 ATP Tour